This list of the Paleozoic life of Colorado contains the various prehistoric life-forms whose fossilized remains have been reported from within the US state of Colorado and are between 538.8 and 252.17 million years of age.

A

 †Acanthatia
 †Acanthatia nupera
 †Acondylacanthus
 †Acondylacanthus nuperus
 †Actinoceras
 †Adiantites
 †Adiantites rockymontanus – type locality for species
 †Aglaocrinus
 †Aglaocrinus magnus
 †Allumettoceras
 †Amorphognathus
 †Amorphognathus ramosa
 †Amplexizaphrentis
 †Amplexizaphrentis pamatus
 †Amplexus
 †Anthracoblattina
 †Anthracoblattina triassica – type locality for species
 †Anthracospirifer
 †Anthracospirifer tanoensis
 †Antiquatonia
 †Antiquatonia coloradoensis
 †Araucarites
  †Archaeocidaris
 †Archaeocidaris cratis
 †Archaeocidaris ourayensis
 †Archaeocidaris triplex
 †Asterophyllites
 †Asterophyllites charaeformis
 †Asterophyllites longifolius – tentative report
  †Astraspis – type locality for genus
 †Astraspis desiderata – type locality for species
 †Athyris
 †Athyris coloradensis
 †Athyris transversa
  †Aviculopecten

B

 †Beloitoceras
 †Beloitoceras accultum
 †Blothrocrinus
 †Bucanella
 †Bythiacanthus

C

  †Calamites
 †Calamites cistii
 †Calamites cruciatus
 †Calamites distachyus
 †Calamites gigas
 †Calamites kutorgae – tentative report
 †Calapoecia
 †Callipteris
 †Callipteris lyratifolia – or unidentified comparable form
 †Camarotoechia
 †Caninia
 †Catactocrinus – tentative report
 †Catactocrinus torus
  †Catenipora
 †Catenipora robusta – or unidentified comparable form
 †Ceraurinus
 †Ceraurinus icarus
 †Cercopyllis
 †Cercopyllis adolescens – type locality for species
 †Cercopyllis delicatula – type locality for species
 †Cercopyllis justiciae – type locality for species
 †Charactoceras – tentative report
 †Chirognathus
 †Chirognathus admiranda
 †Chirognathus aequidentata
 †Chirognathus alternata
 †Chirognathus deformis
 †Chirognathus delicatula
 †Chirognathus dubia
 †Chirognathus duodactyla
 †Chirognathus duodactylus
 †Chirognathus eucharis
 †Chirognathus gradata
 †Chirognathus idonea
 †Chirognathus maniformis
 †Chirognathus monodactyla
 †Chirognathus multidens
 †Chirognathus parallela
 †Chirognathus plana
 †Chirognathus tenuidentata
 †Chirognathus unguliformis
 †Chirognathus vulgaris
 †Coelosporella
 †Coleolus
  †Composita
 †Composita gibbosa
 †Composita ovata
 †Conocardium
 †Cordaianthus
 †Cordaicarpon
  †Cordaites
 †Cordaites angulosostriatus
 †Cornulites
 †Cranaena
 †Cranaena subelliptica
  †Crania
 †Ctenacanthus
 †Ctenacanthus buttersi
 †Ctenacanthus furcicarinatus
 †Ctenodonta
 †Cupressocrinites
  †Cutleria – type locality for genus
 †Cutleria wilmarthi – type locality for species
 †Cyclendoceras
 †Cyclendoceras cylindricum
  †Cyclopteris
 †Cyrtiopsis
 †Cyrtiopsis animasensis
 †Cyrtiopsis conicula
 †Cyrtiopsis kindlei
 †Cyrtodonta
 †Cyrtogomphoceras
  †Cyrtospirifer
 †Cyrtospirifer animasensis
 †Cyrtospirifer whitneyi

D

 †Dactylophyllum – type locality for genus
 †Dactylophyllum johnsoni – type locality for species
 †Desmoinesia
 †Desmoinesia nambeensis
 †Dicladoblatta
 †Dicladoblatta marginata – type locality for species
 †Dicromyocrinus
 †Dicromyocrinus beldenensis
 †Dictyoclostus
 †Dictyorhabdus
 †Dictyorhabdus priscus
 †Diestoceras
 †Diplothmema
 †Diplothmema patentissima
 †Distatoblatta
 †Distatoblatta persistens – type locality for species

E

 †Echinosphaerites – tentative report
  †Edestus
 †Edestus minor
 †Eireocrinus – tentative report
 †Eireocrinus coloradoensis
  †Endoceras
 †Epheboblatta
 †Epheboblatta attenuata – type locality for species
 †Ephippiorthoceras
 †Eretmocrinus
 †Eretmocrinus sawdoi – type locality for species
 †Eriptychius – type locality for genus
 †Eriptychius americanus – type locality for species
 †Erismodus
 †Erismodus quadridactylus
  †Eryops
 †Eryops grandis – or unidentified comparable form
 †Etoblattina
 †Eumetria – tentative report
 †Euomphalus
 †Euomphalus eurekensis – or unidentified comparable form
 †Eusphenopteris

F

 †Floweria
 †Floweria chemungensis
 †Floyda
 †Floyda concentrica

G

 †Garwoodia
 †Garwoodia media
 †Gilmocrinus – tentative report
 †Gilmocrinus albus
 †Girvanella
 †Girvanella nicholsoni
 †Glossites
 †Goleocrinus – tentative report
 †Gomphostrobus
 †Gomphostrobus bifidus

H

  †Halysites
 †Halysites delicatulus – or unidentified comparable form
 †Hebertella
 †Hebertella sinuaia
 †Helicelasma
 †Helicelasma rusticum – or unidentified comparable form
 †Helicotoma
 †Hiscobeccus
 †Hiscobeccus capax
 †Hudsonaster
 †Hypselocrinus – tentative report
 †Hypselocrinus bisonensis

I

 †Isalaux – type locality for genus
 †Isalaux canyonensis – type locality for species
 †Isonema
 †Isonema depressum
 †Isonema humlis

K

 †Kionoceras

L

 †Lambeoceras
 †Laminatia – tentative report
 †Laminatia laminata
 †Lecrosia
 †Lecrosia gouldii
 †Leioproductus
 †Leioproductus coloradensis
 †Leioproductus coloradoensis
 †Leioproductus varispinosus
 †Leperditia
 †Lepidocyclus
 †Lepidocyclus rectangularis – or unidentified comparable form
  †Lepidodendron
 †Lepidodendron johnsonii – type locality for species
 †Lepidophloios
 †Lepidophloios laricinus
 †Lepidophylloides
 †Lepidostrobophyllum
 †Lepidostrobus
 †Lepidostrobus weberensis – type locality for species
 †Leptaena
 †Leptodesma
  †Limnoscelis
 †Limnoscelis dynatis – type locality for species
 †Limnoscelops – type locality for genus
 †Limnoscelops longifemur – type locality for species
 †Lingula
 †Lingula huronensis
 †Linoproductus
 †Linoproductus nodosus
 †Liospira
 †Lophospira
 †Lophospira perangulata
 †Loxonema

M

 †Macluritella
 †Macluritella stantoni
 †Macrostachya – tentative report
 †Mariopteris
 †Mariopteris pygmaea – or unidentified comparable form
 †Meekospira
 †Meristella
 †Modiolopsis
 †Mooreoceras
 †Mytilarca

N

 †Nearoblatta
 †Nearoblatta rotundata – type locality for species
 †Neochonetes
 †Neochonetes whitei – or unidentified comparable form
 †Neorthroblattina
 †Neorthroblattina albolineata – type locality for species
  †Neospirifer
 †Neospirifer goreii
 †Neumatoceras
 †Neuralethopteris
  †Neuropteris
 †Neuropteris auriculata
 †Neuropteris dluhoschi
 †Neuropteris gigantea – tentative report
 †Neuropteris heterophylla

O

 †Odontopteris
 †Odontopteris mccoyensis
 †Odontopteris subcrenulata
  †Ophiacodon
 †Ophiopolytretus
 †Ophiopolytretus aethus
 †Oradectes
 †Oradectes sanmiguelensis – type locality for species
 †Ormoceras
 †Ormoceras pollacki
  †Orthoceras
 †Orthodesma
 †Orthonota
 †Orthotetes
 †Orthotetes inequalis
 †Ortonella
 †Ortonella kershopensis
 †Oulodus
 †Oulodus serratus

P

 †Pachystrophia
 †Pachystrophia contiguus
 †Paladin – tentative report
 †Palaeoglossa
 †Palaeoglossa hurlbuti
 †Parachaetetes
 †Parachaetetes glenwoodensis
 †Paurorhyncha
 †Paurorhyncha cooperi – or unidentified comparable form
 †Paurorhyncha endlichi
  †Pecopteris
 †Pecopteris arborescens
 †Pecopteris pinnatifida
 †Pentaricida
 †Pentaricida pentagonalis
 †Pentaridica
 †Pentaridica pentagonalis
 †Petrablattina
 †Petrablattina aequa – type locality for species
 †Petrodus
 †Petrodus patelliformis
 †Phyloblatta
 †Phyloblatta meieri – type locality for species
 †Physonemus
  †Plaesiomys
 †Plaesiomys bellilamellosus
 †Plaesiomys proavitus
 †Planoproductus
 †Planoproductus depressus
 †Planoproductus hillsboroensis – or unidentified comparable form
 †Planoproductus hillsbororensis – or unidentified comparable form
   †Platyceras
   †Platyhystrix
 †Platyhystrix rugosus
 †Pleiadeaster
 †Pleiadeaster inceptus
 †Poroblattina
 †Poroblattina arcuata – type locality for species
 †Poroblattina lakesii – type locality for species
 †Poroblattina parvula – type locality for species
 †Porostictia
 †Porostictia perchaensis
 †Probillingsites
 †Probillingsites kessleri
 †Productella
 †Protocycloceras
 †Protocycloceras manitouense
 †Pseudochaetes
 †Pseudochaetes similis
 †Psygmophyllum
 †Psygmophyllum cuneifolium – or unidentified comparable form
 †Ptiloporella
 †Ptychomalotoechia
 †Ptychomalotoechia sobrina
 †Pugnax
 †Pugnoides
 †Punctospirifer
 †Punctospirifer solidirostris

R

  †Receptaculites
 †Receptaculites articus – or unidentified comparable form
 †Reticularia
 †Rhabdocarpus
 †Rhabdocarpus dyadicus
 †Rhombopora
 †Rhynchospirina
 †Rhynchospirina scansa – or unidentified related form
 †Rhynchotrema
 †Rhynchotrema argenturbicum
 †Robsonoceras
 †Robsonoceras manitouense

S

 †Saffordophyllum
 †Saffordophyllum franklini
 †Samaropsis
 †Samaropsis hesperius
 †Sandia
 †Sandia welleri
 †Schizodus
 †Schizodus acuminatus
 †Schizophoria
 †Schizophoria austalis
 †Schizophoria australis
 †Schuchertella
 †Schuchertella coloradoensis
 †Scolecopteris
 †Scolecopteris elegans
  †Seymouria
  †Sigillaria
 †Sigillaria elegans – or unidentified comparable form
 †Sigillaria ovata
 †Sigillariostrobus
 †Sigillariostrobus hastatus
  †Sphenophyllum
 †Sphenophyllum obovatum
 †Sphenopteris
 †Sphenopteris asplenioides
 †Sphenopteris cheathami
 †Sphenopteris microcarpa – or unidentified comparable form
 †Sphenopteris schimperiana – tentative report
 †Spiloblattina
 †Spiloblattina weissigensis – type locality for species
 †Spiloblattinidae
 †Spiloblattinidae gardinerana – type locality for species
  †Spirifer
 †Spirifer centronatus
 Spirorbis
 †Spyroceras
 †Stereoconus
 †Stereoconus gracilis
 †Stigmaria
 †Stigmaria ficoides
 †Stigmaria verrucosa
 †Straparollus
 †Straparollus clymenioides – or unidentified comparable form
 †Streblopteria
 †Strepsodiscus – type locality for genus
 †Strepsodiscus major – type locality for species
 †Streptelasma
 †Strimplecrinus
 †Strimplecrinus dyerensis
  †Strophomena
 †Strophopleura
 †Strophopleura notabilis
 †Synarmocrinus
 †Synarmocrinus cobbani
 †Syringodendron
  †Syringopora
 †Syringopora surcularia
 †Syringospira
 †Syringospira prima

T

 †Tarassocrinus
 †Tarassocrinus synchlydus
 †Tarthinia
  †Taxocrinus
 †Toernquistia
 †Trichopitys
 †Trichopitys whitei
 †Trochonema
 †Trochonema umbilicata

U

 †Ullmannia
 †Ulocrinus
 †Ulocrinus rockymontanus

V

 †Vanuxemia
 †Vanuxemia rotundata
 †Vaughnictis
 †Vaughnictis smithae – type locality for species

W

  †Walchia
 †Walchia hypnoides
 †Walchia imbricata – or unidentified comparable form
 †Walchia piniformis
 †Walchia stricta
 †Walchiastrobus
 †Westonoceras
 †Wewokella
 †Wewokella solida
 †Wilbernicyathus
 †Wilbernicyathus donegani

Z

 †Zaphrenthis
 †Zygospira
 †Zygospira modesta – tentative report

References
 

Paleozoic
Life
Colorado
Colorado-related lists